Rulyrana adiazeta is a species of frog in the family Centrolenidae. It is endemic to the western slopes of the Cordillera Oriental, Colombia, in the departments of Cundinamarca, Santander, and Tolima.

It occurs on vegetation next to streams. It is a common species but is locally suffering from habitat loss caused by agricultural expansion.

References

adiazeta
Amphibians of the Andes
Amphibians of Colombia
Endemic fauna of Colombia
Amphibians described in 1991
Taxa named by John Douglas Lynch
Taxonomy articles created by Polbot